Dasytes  gonocerus is a species of soft wing flower beetles belonging to the family Melyridae.

Distribution
This species has an extensive and discontinuous presence in part of Europe (Andorra, Bosnia and Herzegovina, Bulgaria, Croatia, Switzerland, France, Italy and Spain).

Habitat
It mainly occurs at high altitude in mountainous meadows of central Spain, of the Cantabrian mountain, on the Pyrenees, on the Massif Central, in the western part of the Alps, in part of the Apennines and on several summits of the Balkans.

Description
These small black beetles  have long erect black pubescence  over the entire surface of the elytra and pronotum.

This species is very similar to Dasytes alpigradus and Dasytes lombardus. The three species are morphologically very close and only the males can be differentiated with certainty after examination of their reproductive organs (aedeagus).

Phenology
Adults can be found from July to September. These beetles feed on pollen and can be found especially on yellow Asteraceae.

References

External links
 
 
 iNaturalist
 Galerie Insecte 

Melyridae
Beetles of Europe